John Robert Zellner (born April 5, 1939) is an American civil rights activist. He graduated from Huntingdon College in 1961 and that year became a member of the Student Nonviolent Coordinating Committee (SNCC) as its first white field secretary. Zellner was involved in numerous civil rights efforts, including nonviolence workshops at Talladega College, protests for integration in Danville, Virginia, and organizing Freedom Schools in Greenwood, Mississippi, in 1964. He also investigated the murders of Chaney, Goodman, and Schwerner that summer.

Zellner was arrested and severely beaten for his activism several times. He left SNCC in 1966 but continued his civil rights activism. He later taught the history of the civil rights movement at Long Island University and published a memoir of his activism that was adapted into the 2020 film Son of the South, with Lucas Till portraying him. Zellner was arrested as recently as 2013, for protesting a North Carolina voter ID law.

Early life and education 
John Robert Zellner was born to James Abraham Zellner and Ruby Hardy Zellner on April 5, 1939, in Jay, Florida. His relatives were involved in the Ku Klux Klan (KKK) and his father and grandfather were members. Zellner's father organized for the white supremacist group but eventually left the Klan after supporting Jewish resistance in German-occupied Europe during World War II. After James left the KKK, Zellner's grandparents disowned their son.  James then became a minister in the Methodist Church.

Zellner was educated at W. S. Neal High School in Brewton, Alabama, and Murphy High School where he graduated in 1957. He attended Huntingdon College, which was at the time an all-white school. While a senior there he researched "solutions to racial problems in the South" as a sociology assignment. For the paper Zellner and four others wanted to interview civil rights activists Martin Luther King Jr. and Ralph Abernathy. They told their professor they planned to visit King and Abernathy at the Montgomery Improvement Association (MIA). He responded by suggesting they visit the library or conduct field research through the KKK or white citizens' council, and told the five it "won't be necessary" to study multiple points of view in the issue of race. The five disregarded his instructions and discussed civil rights with students at the Alabama State College for Negroes and visited the MIA's offices. The group ended up interviewing King, Rosa Parks, and E. D. Nixon, catalyzing Zellner's interest in the civil rights movement. The white community did not approve, and Zellner had crosses burned outside his dorm by the KKK, the school suggested his expulsion, and the Attorney General of Alabama accused him of communism. Zellner's interest in the movement grew, and he helped Freedom Riders who were under attack by white supremacists in May 1961. Zellner graduated from Huntingdon with a degree in psychology and sociology later that year. Zellner later studied for a summer at the Highlander Folk School and two years at Brandeis University but did not graduate.

Through his meetings over civil rights Zellner had been introduced to the Student Nonviolent Coordinating Committee (SNCC), a student-led civil rights organization. He was contacted by Anne Braden and soon hired to "conduct outreach to whites", becoming a formal volunteer on September 11, 1961. He was SNCC's first and, for the first year he worked, only white field secretary.

Civil rights work 
As a civil rights activist, Zellner was beaten unconscious several times, leading to brain damage and post-traumatic stress disorder. He was severely beaten by white men after protesting the murder of Herbert Lee, as well as the expulsion of Brenda Travis and Ike Lewis from Burglund High School. Police officers and Federal Bureau of Investigation agents watched the beating occur. Zellner was briefly involved in running a high school for students who had dropped out of Burglund in protest. He was arrested on December 10, 1961, during the Albany Movement when he sat in an integrated group on a train. Hundreds protested the arrest, including almost three hundred who marched while they were on trial.

In 1962 Zellner and Chuck McDew visited Dion Diamond, an imprisoned Freedom Rider in Baton Rouge, Louisiana. The two were arrested, held for a month, and charged with criminal anarchy. Zellner was arrested again in January 1963 at Huntingdon College on charges of vagrancy, which was later changed to false pretenses. He was defended against a possible ten year sentence by Clifford Durr and Charles Morgan Jr., and acquitted. After the Children's March in Birmingham, Alabama, in 1963 turned violent, Zellner and other activists went to the city. He attended the March on Washington for Jobs and Freedom in 1963. Zellner was involved in nonviolence workshops at Talladega College, protests for integration in Danville, Virginia, and organizing Freedom Schools in Greenwood, Mississippi, in 1964 during the Freedom Summer, when he became close friends with Stokely Carmichael. He also investigated the murders of Chaney, Goodman, and Schwerner with Rita Schwerner. Also that year he was the co-director of the Southern Student Organizing Committee. In about 1964, Zellner took a two-year break from his civil rights activism to study towards earning a Master's in sociology at Brandeis. He did not graduate and returned to SNCC, where he was one of just seven active white members.

He left SNCC in 1966 after the group expelled all white members, and moved to the Southern Conference Educational Fund.  Zellner appealed SNCC's decision in 1967 as he presented a project to organize white workers in Mississippi, but was denied re-entry. He continued his project without their support, moving with his wife, Dorothy Zellner, to the Gulf Coast and establishing the Grass-Roots Organizing Workers (GROW; also known as Get Rid of [George] Wallace). The couple also created the Deep South Education and Research Center. Their project consisted of organizing pulpwood workers to advocate for higher wages. A strike beginning in September 1971 was successful after three months. During the civil rights movement, Zellner was arrested many times, with one source counting 25 arrests by the summer of 1963. In the 1970s he lectured at the National Institute for Minorities in China (now Minzu University of China).

From 1991 to 1993 he worked to earn a PhD from Tulane University in history, writing a dissertation on the civil rights movement. That year he was hired to teach about the civil rights movement at Long Island University. Zellner published Wrong Side of Murder Creek: A White Southerner in the Freedom Movement in 2008. After moving to Wilson, North Carolina, Zellner was arrested in 2013 protesting a North Carolina voter ID law.

Legacy 
The 2020 film Son of the South was based on Zellner's memoir. Zellner later described his involvement with SNCC as "the greatest thing that ever happened in my life." An oral history based on interviews with Zellner is included in the 2006 book Generation on Fire: Voices of Protest from the 1960s by Jeff Kisseloff.

Personal life 
Zellner has been married at least twice, first to Dorothy Zellner (from August 9, 1963) and later to Linda Miller.

Notes

References

Bibliography 
 
 
 
 

1939 births
American civil rights activists
Huntingdon College alumni
Long Island University faculty
Tulane University alumni
Student Nonviolent Coordinating Committee
People from Santa Rosa County, Florida
Living people